In mathematics, cyclical monotonicity is a generalization of the notion of monotonicity to the case of vector-valued function.

Definition 
A correspondence  is called cyclically monotone if for every set of points  with  it holds that

Properties 
 For the case of scalar functions of one variable the definition above is equivalent to usual monotonicity.
 Gradients of convex functions are cyclically monotone.
 In fact, the converse is true.

References 

Mathematical terminology
Mathematical concepts